The Diocese of the Carolinas is a diocese of the Anglican Church in North America, comprising 35 parishes in the American states of North Carolina, South Carolina, Georgia, Tennessee and Kentucky. Their first bishop is Steve Wood. He is also the rector of St. Andrew's Church, in Mount Pleasant, South Carolina. David C. Bryan was elected Suffragan Bishop in June 2016, with Thaddeus R. Barnum as Assisting Bishop.

The diocese was formed when Anglican clergy and lay people, many of whom had left the Episcopal Church, began to gather to discuss starting a new diocese in the Anglican Church in North America. Chief among the architects of new diocese were Filmore Strunk, rector of All Saints' Church in Charlotte, North Carolina, and Steve Wood, rector of St. Andrew's Church in Mt. Pleasant, South Carolina.

The new diocese was approved unanimously at the Provincial Assembly of the ACNA, on 6 June 2012, with Steve Wood as their first bishop elected. He was consecrated on 25 August 2012, at St. Andrew's Church in Mount Pleasant, by Archbishop Robert Duncan, Archbishop-elect of Uganda, Stanley Ntagali, Bishop Roger Ames, Bishop John Guernsey and Bishop Alphonsa Gadsden, all three from the ACNA.

References

External links
 

Anglican dioceses established in the 21st century
Anglican realignment dioceses
Dioceses of the Anglican Church in North America